Days of Wrath is a 2008 American drama film starring Jeffrey Dean Morgan, Laurence Fishburne and Wilmer Valderrama. The film is directed by Celia Fox, and written by Mitchell Kapner and Michael Markee.

Plot
In the Los Angeles streets, Danny Boy is a gangster without compassion or regret. His sends his gang out to carjack a rapper dubbed Cash Flow. However, in the process, his gang ends up killing Anita Terrazas, the former girlfriend of a local TV-station manager, Bryan Gordon. The victim also happens to be the mother of Mario, who is the leader of Danny Boy's own gang. Gordon's ambitious young reporter, Samantha Rodriguez, used to be involved with the local gangs, but has now cleaned up her act and lectures high school kids about the ills of gangs. Anita, Mario's grandmother, thinks he is wasting his life. She also disdains Gordon for the way he impacted her daughter's life. Soon, all the gangs band together to get Danny Boy, but he is smart, fearless and driven without conscience. The police are also after him. It is a race to see who will get him first.

Cast
 Jeffrey Dean Morgan as Bryan Gordon
 Amber Valletta as Jane Summers
 Wilmer Valderrama as Danny Boy
 Laurence Fishburne as Mr. Stafford
 Jesse Garcia as Mario Terrazas
 Brandon T. Jackson as "Lil One"
 Ana Claudia Talancón as Samantha Rodriguez
 Taye Diggs as Steve Laredo
 Lupe Ontiveros as Anita Terrazas
 Rick Ross as "G Dogg"
 David Banner as Kryme
 Josue Aguirre as Enrique
 Ricardo Chavira as Detective Romeros
 Raja Fenske as Hugo
 Terry Finn as Emily Conley
 Melyssa Ford as Lysa
 Kurupt as Bobby
 Faizon Love as "Cash Flow"
 Slim Thug as "Big Bear"
 Doug Hutchison as Vadim

Release
After many delays, on February 25, 2014, director and producer Celia Fox finally announced that the film would have a release late 2014.

References

External links
 
 

2008 films
2008 crime drama films
Films set in Los Angeles
Films scored by Graeme Revell
American crime drama films
2000s English-language films
2000s American films